The Pony Express Region is an area in northwestern Missouri. It takes its name from the Pony Express mail service based in Saint Joseph, Missouri. The Pony Express name is historically linked to St Joseph. It is often used to define the city or the St Joseph Metropolitan Area  The term is often used for a wider area of northwestern Missouri between Kansas City and Iowa. Pony Express Lake, a Missouri Department of Conservation lake, is located east of St Joseph towards Interstate 35.

References

Missouri culture